Public Schools of Brookline (PSB) is the school district of Brookline, Massachusetts.

 it had over 7,500 students. They operate eight elementary (K-8) schools and one high school in the Town of Brookline.

Schools
 Senior high school
 Brookline High School
 K-8 schools
 Edith C. Baker School
 Florida R. Ridley School (formerly Edward Devotion School and Coolidge Corner School)
 Michael Driscoll School
 Heath School
 Amos A. Lawrence School
 William H. Lincoln School
 John Pierce School
 John D. Runkle School
 Preschool
 Brookline Early Education Program (BEEP)
Other Buildings used for special purposes
 The old Lincoln School at 194  Boylston Street.
 The Baldwin School at 484 Heath Street.

References

External links
 Public Schools of Brookline

School districts in Massachusetts
Brookline, Massachusetts
Education in Norfolk County, Massachusetts